Iñapari is a critically endangered indigenous South American language spoken by just four people in Perú along the Las Piedras river near the mouth of the Sabaluyoq river. The language is already extinct in neighboring Bolivia. All four remaining speakers are bilingual in Spanish and none have any children, which will likely lead to its extinction once the speakers die. The Iñapari language currently has a published dictionary.

The Pacaguara (Pacahuara) dialect described by Mercier was at least ethnically distinct.  (But see Pacaguara language.)

Phonology 
According to Parker, Iñapari has eleven consonants and six vowels.

The status of the lateral as a phoneme is considered dubious as [l] is found in few words and may be a phonetic variant of /r/.

Iñapari's six vowels are /i e a ï o u/, where /ï/ is a high back unrounded vowel.

Notes

External links
Ethnologue language map, Iñapari has reference number 40

Languages of Peru
Languages of Bolivia
Arawakan languages
Critically endangered languages
Endangered indigenous languages of the Americas